Cerani (possibly from Aymara sira fart, flatulence, -ni a suffix to indicate ownership, "the one with flatulence") is a mountain in the west of the Chila mountain range in the Andes of Peru, about  high. It is located in the Arequipa Region, Castilla Province, on the border of the districts Chachas and Choco. Cerani lies northeast of the lake Chachas, southeast of a lake named Cochapunco (possibly from Quechua for "lake reservoir") and southwest of  Yuraccacsa and Casiri near the volcanic zone in the west.

References

Mountains of Peru
Mountains of Arequipa Region